Metron is a genus of skippers in the family Hesperiidae.

Species
Recognised species include:
 Metron chrysogastra Butler, 1870
 Metron fasciata (Möschler, 1877)
 Metron hypochlora (Draudt, 1923)
 Metron noctis (Kaye, 1913)
 Metron oropa Hewitson, 1877
 Metron voranus (Mabille, 1891)
 Metron zimra (Hewitson, 1877)

References

Natural History Museum Lepidoptera genus database

Hesperiini
Hesperiidae genera